The Rainbow Health Initiative (RHI) is a Minnesota-based organization working to improve the health of the lesbian, gay, bisexual, and transgender (LGBT) Minnesotans through "research, education, and advocacy." Founded in 2001  by physicians and health advocates, RHI has re-framed the discussion of LGBT health in Minnesota from HIV/AIDS to a broader definition of the health disparities affecting LGBT persons.  On May 2, 2018, the Rainbow Health Initiative merged with the Minnesota Aids Project to form the newly created Just Us Health.

Research activities
RHI is involved in ongoing community-based participatory research to utilize community perceptions and experiences to develop programs that ultimately improve the health of LGBTQ Minnesotans. Since 2005, RHI has collected thousands of community health assessments on self-identified LGBTQ people. These data is then disseminated to the community to develop reports, organizational directions, and community education. Additional innovative exploratory research projects include determining causes for the significantly elevated pregnancy rates among LGBTQ youth, and developing physician-delivered smoking cessation interventions for people living with HIV/AIDS. Past data includes top health concerns, insurance status, whether an individual has disclosed their sexual orientation to their health care provider, and views on tobacco control. They also conducted focus groups in several communities (lesbian, bisexual, gay men, transgender, deaf, and greater Minnesota) to better understand why LGBT people smoke, what public health strategies are most effective at reaching the community, and to understand attitudes toward smoke-free policies. They published a report entitled, Creating an Effective Tobacco Plan for Minnesota's Gay, Lesbian, Bisexual and Transgender Communities.

See also
 List of LGBT medical organizations

References

External links
 

LGBT health organizations in the United States
LGBT in Minnesota
LGBT political advocacy groups in Minnesota
Medical and health organizations based in Minnesota
2001 establishments in Minnesota